Adrian Pertl (born 22 April 1996) is an Austrian World Cup alpine ski racer, and specializes in slalom. At his first  World Championships in 2021, he was the silver medalist in slalom.

Biography
Born in Sankt Veit an der Glan, Carinthia, Pertl was junior world champion in 2017 in slalom at Åre, Sweden. He made his World Cup debut in January 2018 at Schladming, and gained his first podium in February 2020 at Chamonix, France.

In February 2021, Pertl achieved his greatest success to date by winning the silver medal in the slalom at the World Championships in Cortina d'Ampezzo, Italy.

World Cup results

Season standings

Race podiums
 0 wins
 1 podium – (1 SL); 8 top tens

World Championship results

References

External links

Austrian Ski team – official site – Adrian Pertl – 

1996 births
Living people
Austrian male alpine skiers
People from Sankt Veit an der Glan
Sportspeople from Carinthia (state)
21st-century Austrian people